The A5147 is a road in northern England that runs from Maghull in Merseyside to Scarisbrick in Lancashire.

Route

Merseyside

It begins off the A59 road in Maghull, where it is called Liverpool Road North. After leaving the town, it crosses over the Leeds and Liverpool Canal in Lydiate. It passes the Scotch Piper Inn before entering Lancashire at Downholland Cross.

Lancashire

It crosses over the canal twice more, then proceeds onto Haskayne and Halsall, passing through open countryside, before terminating at its junction with the A570 road in Scarisbrick.

See also
British road numbering scheme

References 

Roads in England
Roads in Lancashire
Roads in Merseyside